The Serbian Super League, referred to as the Mozzart Bet Super League for sponsorship reasons, is a Serbian professional league for football clubs.

At the top of the Serbian football league system, it is the country's primary football competition. It is usually contested by 16 clubs, but the 2020-21 season was contested by 20 clubs, because the Football Association of Serbia restructured the league due to the COVID-19 pandemic, operating a system of promotion and relegation with Serbian First League, the second tier in the Serbian football pyramid.

The SuperLiga was formed during the summer of 2005 as the country's top football league competition in Serbia and Montenegro. Since summer 2006 after the secession of Montenegro from Serbia, the league only has had Serbian clubs.

Serbian clubs used to compete in the Yugoslav First League. This competition was formed in 1923 and lasted until 2003. After the downfall of SFR Yugoslavia in 1991 a new Yugoslavia would be formed that would be named FR Yugoslavia with Montenegro and Serbia. They kept the name Yugoslavia until 2003 when the country changed its name to Serbia and Montenegro: this union lasted until 2006 when Montenegro gained independence and formed its own league, the Montenegrin First League.

The current SuperLiga champions are Red Star Belgrade. UEFA currently ranks the league 11th in Europe of 55 leagues. The league was known as Meridian SuperLiga from 2005 until 2008. The league's official sponsor until 2015 was beer brand Jelen pivo, this resulted in the league's official name to be Jelen SuperLiga.

Format

Competition
The SuperLiga began as a league with a playoff system in an attempt to boost ratings and improve competition. After the first season however, the SuperLiga changed its format. The 2007–08 season was the first to be played in a more traditional format. The league no longer divided into a play-off and play-out group midway through the campaign. Instead, the 12 teams began playing each other three times in a more conventional league format. After two seasons with that format the Football Association of Serbia decided to add 4 teams to the SuperLiga. The 2009–10 season will be the first with a 16 team league played in a conventional league format of one home and one away match rather than the previous 3 match encounters. This drops the match schedule from 33 rounds to 30.

As of the 2015-16 season, the league reverted to its previous playoff system, whereby the top 8 placed teams compete in the championship round at the end of the season and the 8 lowest placed teams play in the relegation playoff round. The two bottom placed teams are relegated to the second division, the Serbian Prva Liga. The third lowest-placed team is then sent to a relegation playoff against the third-placed team in the second division. Whichever team wins will play in the SuperLiga the following season.

Qualification for UEFA competitions
The champions of the SuperLiga are drawn into the primary qualifying rounds for the UEFA Champions League, while the second and third placed teams are drawn into the primary qualifying rounds for the UEFA Europa Conference League.

History
The Yugoslav First League started being played in 1923, and gathered the best clubs from the former Yugoslavia. In 1991, clubs from Slovenia and Croatia left and formed their own league systems, and in 1992 so did the clubs from Bosnia and Herzegovina and Macedonia. The Yugoslav First League was played since 1992 with clubs from Serbia and Montenegro, until 2006, when Montenegro declared independence and subsequently formed its own league system.  Since 2006 the league is formed exclusively by clubs from Serbia and got renamed into Serbian SuperLiga.

Serbian League (1920–1922 / 1940–1944 / 1945–1946)

Kingdom of Yugoslavia League (1923–1940)

Yugoslav First League (1946–1992)

First League of Federal Republic Yugoslavia/Serbia and Montenegro (1992–2006)

In 1992 the Yugoslav First League became the First League of FR Yugoslavia (Prva savezna liga or Meridian SuperLiga) and was played since then with the clubs from Serbia and Montenegro.

The league winner had access to the UEFA Champions League qualifications rounds, and the 2nd, 3rd and the Cup winner had played in the UEFA Cup. The bottom clubs would be relegated to the two Second Leagues depending on the republic they were based in, the Second League of Serbia (Druga savezna liga Srbija) and the Second League of Montenegro (Druga savezna liga grupa Crna Gora).

In 2002, FR Yugoslavia changed its name to Serbia and Montenegro, and the league was named First League of Serbia and Montenegro between 2002 and its dissolution, in 2006. In 2006 Serbia and Montenegro separated and formed their own top leagues (Serbian SuperLiga and Montenegrin First League). Serbian SuperLiga was officially declared the successor of the First Leagues of FR Yugoslavia and Serbia and Montenegro.

A total of 41 clubs participated between 1992 and 2006, being 34 from Serbia, 6 from Montenegro and one from Bosnia and Herzegovina (Borac Banja Luka was temporarily based in Serbia in early 1990s). A total of 3 clubs were champions, all from Serbia, Partizan (8 times), Red Star (5 times) and Obilić (once).

Serbian Superliga (2006–)
A total of 28 clubs participated between 2006 and 2013 in the Serbian Superliga. After 14 seasons, Partizan has won 8 championship titles and Red Star has won 6 championship title. Also, Partizan is a record holder of winning 6 consecutive champion titles.

Serbian all-time champions (1923–present)

All-time table 2006–2023
The following is a list of clubs who have played in the Serbian SuperLiga at any time since its formation in 2006 to the current season. Teams playing in the 2022–23 Serbian SuperLiga are indicated in bold. A total of 37 teams have played in the Serbian SuperLiga. The table is accurate as of the end of the 2021–22 season.

League or status at 2022–23:

Current clubs

Map

The following 16 clubs compete in the Linglong Tire SuperLiga during the 2022–23 season.

Stadiums

Serbian top level football has been played in 27 stadiums since its formation in 2006. The top-three stadiums by clubs who are competing currently (2021-2022) in the Serbian top flight by seating capacity are Belgrade-based Red Star Stadium, Partizan Stadium and FK Radnicki Nis Cair Stadium. 

Below are the ten largest stadiums in Serbia of clubs who are competing or have competed in the Serbian top division of football. Currently in the below list only seven of these clubs are competing in the Serbian top flight, them been as follows : Red Star, Partizan, Vojvodina, Radnički Niš, Radnički Kragujevac, Napredak Kruševac and Spartak Subotica.

Players

Top scorers
Bold denotes players still playing in the Serbian SuperLiga.
Italics denote players active outside the Serbian SuperLiga.

Most appearances
Bold denotes players still playing in the Serbian SuperLiga.
Italics denote players active outside the Serbian SuperLiga.

Foreign players
See List of all former and current foreign football players in Serbia

Superliga records and statistics

Attendance
 Highest single game attendance: 48,347, Red Star vs. OFK Beograd during 2013–14 season
 Highest average home attendance: 19,819 (15 home games), Red Star during 2011–12 season

Single game
 Biggest home win: 7–0, Vojvodina vs. Napredak during 2009–10, Partizan vs. BSK Borča during 2012–13 season, Čukarički vs. Rad during 2014–15 season, Zemun vs. Bačka during 2018–19 season and TSC vs. Novi Pazar during 2020–21 season 
 Biggest away win: 0–7,  Radnički Niš beats Javor during 2019–20 season
 Most goals in a single game: 9, Čukarički 2–7 Red Star during 2015–16 season
 Highest draw: Čukarički 4–4 Vojvodina during 2008–09 season, TSC 4–4 Radnički 1923 during 2021–22 season
 Fastest turnover: Red Star scoring 2 goals in 61 seconds. Metalac 1-2 Red Star during 2016–17 season

Players
 Most league appearances: 325, Janko Tumbasević in 14 seasons between 2007–08 and 2021–22
 Most league goals: 89, Milan Bojović playing for Čukarički, Jagodina, Vojvodina, Radnički Niš and Mladost Lučani
 Most league goals in a season: 29, Ricardo Gomes for Partizan during 2021–22 season
 Youngest player used: 16 years, 0 months and 7 days, Luka Belić for OFK Beograd vs. Red Star on 25 April 2012
 Oldest player used: 41 years, 4 months and 19 days, Saša Ilić for FK Partizan vs. FK Proleter on 19 May 2019
 Fastest hat-trick: 9 min, Dragan Mrđa for Red Star vs. Spartak on 29 September 2013
 Most league goals in one game: 5, Petar Jelić playing for Rad vs. Voždovac on 23 August 2014. and Saša Marjanović playing for Radnički Niš vs. Radnik Surdulica on 28 April 2016
 Fastest goal: 10.5 seconds, Uroš Đurđević playing for Partizan vs. Čukarički on 11 December 2016.
 Most hat-tricks in SuperLiga: 6, Dragan Mrđa playing for Vojvodina and Red Star
 Longest scoring run in SuperLiga: – Hugo Vieira 15 goals, 10 games playing for Red Star during 2015–16 season.
 Fastest own goal: 52 seconds, Ivan Bandalovski playing for Partizan vs Čukarički during 2015–16 season.

Clubs
 Most consecutive league victories: 24 out of 37 games, Red Star during 2015–16 season
 Most consecutive league defeats: 14, Čukarički during 2010–11 season
 Most consecutive league games without defeat (undefeated run): 57, Red Star from 14 October 2017 to 20 April 2019
 Club having top season scorers: 3, Red Star
 Club with overall SuperLiga hat-tricks: 12, Red Star

Season
 Most points won in a single season: 108, Red Star during 2020–21 season
 Fewest points won in a single season: 5, Čukarički during 2010–11 season
 Fewest won games in a single season: 0, Čukarički during 2010–11 season
 Most team goals in a single season: 114, Red Star during 2020–21 season
 Fewest team goals in a single season: 10, Čukarički during 2010–11 season
 Most team goals against in a single season: 65, Čukarički during 2010–11 season
 Fewest team goals against in a single season: 12, Partizan during 2011–12 season
 The best goal difference in a single season: +94, Red Star during 2020–21 season
 The worst goal difference in a single season: –55, Čukarički during 2010–11 season and Mačva Šabac during 2020–21 season
 Most hat-tricks in a season: 3 Dragan Mrđa playing for Vojvodina during 2009–10 season, Nermin Haskić playing for Radnički Niš during 2018–19 season and Aleksandar Katai playing for Red Star during 2021–22 season

Goalkeepers
 Goalscoring goalkeepers (excluding own goals):
 Darko Božović (Bežanija 1–1 Voždovac, 28 October 2006)
 Vladimir Stojković (Partizan 7–0 BSK Borča, 11 August 2012)
 Milan Borjan (Red Star 3–1 Voždovac, 22 May 2022)

UEFA ranking

The following data indicates Serbian coefficient rankings between European football leagues.

 Highest position: 11 (2021-22 season, 33.375 points)
 Lower position: 47 (1996)

Country

Team

All time Serbian football clubs in European and World competitions

European Cup/ UEFA Champions League

UEFA Cup/ UEFA Europa League

UEFA Cup Winners' Cup

Intercontinental Cup

UEFA Super Cup

UEFA Intertoto Cup

Inter-Cities Fairs Cup

The Golden Star
Based on an idea of Umberto Agnelli, the honor of Golden Star for Sports Excellence was introduced to recognize sides that have won multiple championships or other honours by the display of gold stars on their team badges and jerseys.

The current officially sanctioned SuperLiga stars are:
    Red Star Belgrade received in 2019
   Partizan Belgrade received in 2008

Names of the competition
 2006–2008: Meridian SuperLiga
 2008–2015: Jelen SuperLiga
 2015–2019: Serbian SuperLiga
 2019–2022: Linglong Tire SuperLiga
 2022–2025: Mozzart Bet SuperLiga

Broadcasting rights

Television
Serbian Superliga games are broadcast live on Arena Sport in countries of Ex-Yugoslavia. 02.TV starts broadcasting Serbian Superliga from March 2019. SportKlub Slovenia is also broadcasting live Serbian Superliga matches.

The Eternal derby is the game that attracts most attention from the foreign media.  In 2010, the 139th Eternal derby was broadcast in 19 countries and over 60 foreign correspondents were present.

Sponsorships
 Nike (2006–2014)
 Umbro (2014–present)

See also

 Serbian Cup
 List of football clubs in Serbia
 Serbia national football team
 Yugoslav First League
 First League of Serbia and Montenegro
 Prva Futsal Liga

References

External links
 Official website 
 Unofficial website 
 Serbian SuperLiga Stats at Utakmica.rs 
 Serbian SuperLiga Fixtures and Results at Soccerway 
 Yugoslavia/Serbia (and Montenegro) - List of Champions, RSSSF.com 

 
Top level football leagues in Europe
1
Recurring sporting events established in 2006
2006 establishments in Serbia
Professional sports leagues in Serbia